Gebhard II, called Gebhard von Hohenwart, was the bishop of Regensburg (or Ratisbon) from 1023 to 17 March 1036. He succeeded Gebhard I. On his death, he was succeeded by Gebhard III.

11th-century Roman Catholic bishops in Bavaria
1036 deaths
Roman Catholic bishops of Regensburg
Year of birth unknown